Mission: Wolf (abbreviated M:W) is a remote wolf sanctuary near Westcliffe, Colorado in the Sangre de Cristo Mountains. It houses up to 40 wolves and wolfdog crosses, and works to promote a better understanding of wolves in order to further reintroduction efforts and discourage attempts to keep wolves as pets.

Founding 
Mission: Wolf was founded by Colorado-born Kent Weber and his wife, Tracy Ane Brooks, as a remote shelter for a dozen purebred timber wolves and wolfdogs. In the first year of constructing a house, they took in several wolf puppies. As word got out, the site began to attract visitors, who helped expand the site, allowing for the adoption of more wolves.  In the peak of Mission: Wolf's adoption frenzy, they had 52 wolves and wolf-dogs, before realizing that there were far more animals than they would be able take in. The number of animals at the sanctuary at any one time is variable.

Mission 
Mission: Wolf's core goal is to educate the public about wolves, and to clear their reputation as 'The Big Bad Wolf', through experiential education and respect for animals. They also advocate against the breeding of wolf-dogs and owning either wolves or wolf-dogs as pets.

Mission: Wolf also has an emphasis on sustainability and respect for the environment. The organization operates on solar power, and sources recycled building materials. Mission: Wolf accepts volunteers on both a short (2 weeks - 1 mo) and long term (1-3 months) basis. Many of the core administrative staff are volunteers as well.

Sustainability 
All the buildings at Mission: Wolf were built by volunteers and with donated materials. M:W is almost completely self-sufficient, using donations to pay for what they need, solar power on sunny days, and a propane generator when it is needed. They accept donations of livestock from ranchers, as well as hunting scraps and roadkill.

Meeting the wolves 

Mission: Wolf takes in only wolves who were born in captivity. Wolves that are born in captivity can never be returned to the wild, and thus, they live out their lives at Mission: Wolf. As of December 2018, 26 wolves and wolf-dogs live at Mission: Wolf. Since founding, M:W has had to turn down over 9,000 requests to take in wolves and wolf-dogs.

The sanctuary is open to visitors. There is no specific cost to enter, but donations of cash and in-kind donations are welcomed. Depending on the day and the attitude of the animals, visitors may be able to interact directly with the wolves. 

Mission: Wolf also tours America as a part of its Ambassador Wolf Program, traveling thousands of miles in their Wolfhound, a full-size Greyhound Bus that was converted to be able to house, minimally, two adults and two wolves, and assorted supplies. The Ambassador Program has visited schools, universities, NGOs and nonprofits, as well as governmental organizations.

Feeding 
Beginning in summer 2008, the wolves are all fed a small portion once a day, in what is called daily feed. This is mainly used as a way to provide vitamin supplements and medications to the wolves and check on their health; before that, the wolves had only received the feast-and-famine cycle of two large meals a week, similar to their eating schedule in the wild. This is now called "big feed", and still occurs twice a week, though the wolves get slightly less food, as some is stored away for daily feed.

References

External links 

Mission: Wolf Official Website

Geography of Colorado
Mammal conservation
Dog parks in the United States
Wolf organizations
Wolf parks
1986 establishments in Colorado